Neobrachylepas is a monotypic genus of crustaceans belonging to the monotypic family Neobrachylepadidae. The only species is Neobrachylepas relica.

The species is found in Pacific Ocean (near New Zealand).

References

Barnacles
Maxillopoda genera